Benghari Banagram Union is a union parishad under Boda Upazila of Panchagarh District in the Rangpur Division of northwestern Bangladesh. The area of this union nearly 30 square kilometers. Islam is the major religion of this union but a large number of Hindus population live here from long time ago. Some Santali Christians also live here. Boda, Maydandighi, Tepukuria, Mondolhat is the commercial centre for the residents.

Location of attractions
Ulipukuri Dighi(Pond)
Ulipukuri Christian mission
Boalmari 
Kazi Firms
Tepukuria

References

External links
 Panchagarh.info: Schools and Colleges incl Benghari

Panchagarh District